Zonalny (masculine), Zonalnaya (feminine), or Zonalnoye (neuter) may refer to:
Zonalny District, a district of Altai Krai, Russia
Zonalny (rural locality) (Zonalnaya, Zonalnoye), name of several rural localities in Russia
Zonalnoye Airport, an airport in Sakhalin Oblast, Russia